The Flying Sailor is a 2022 Canadian animated short film directed by Oscar-nominated directors Wendy Tilby and Amanda Forbis. The film debuted at the 2022 Annecy International Animation Film Festival and has received several nominations and awards, including a nomination for Best Animated Short Film at the 95th Academy Awards, and winning the award for the Best Canadian Film at the Ottawa International Animation Festival.

The film was named to the Toronto International Film Festival's annual year-end Canada's Top Ten list for 2022.

Plot 
When a nearby ship explodes, a sailor is launched on an unexpected existential voyage. The 8-minute short explores the fragility of life through a sailor's near-death experience inspired by the real life catastrophic Halifax Explosion of 1917. The last credit states the film is dedicated to "Charlie Mayers - A Sailor who, in the Halifax Explosion of 1917, flew over 2 kilometers and lived to tell about it."

Reception

References

External links 
 
 The Flying Sailor Trailer on YouTube
 The Flying Sailor to stream for free on The New Yorker
Watch The Flying Sailor at NFB.ca

2022 films
2022 short films
Canadian animated short films
Existentialist films
Films set in 1917
Films directed by Wendy Tilby